The 1918–19 National Challenge Cup was the sixth National Challenge cup held by the United States Football Association. Bethlehem Steel won their fourth title in a 2–0 victory over Paterson F.C.

Bracket
Home teams listed on top of bracket

(*) replay after tied match
w/o walkover/forfeit victory awarded

Final

See also
1919 American Cup

Sources
USOpenCup.com
U.S. Soccer History - 1919

References

Nat
U.S. Open Cup